Mihailo Ivanović (born 29 November 2004) is a Serbian professional footballer who plays as a centre-forward for Serie A club Sampdoria, on loan from Serbian SuperLiga club Vojvodina.

Club career

Vojvodina
At the end of March 2021, Ivanović signed his first professional contract with Vojvodina. On 22 May 2022, Ivanović made his first-team debut, replacing Veljko Simić in the 90th minute in a 0:2 away win against TSC Bačka Topola.

Sampdoria (loan) 
On 8 August 2022, Ivanović joined Serie A side Sampodria on a season-long loan, with the option to buy.

International career

Youth
Ivanović was called-up in the Serbia U-17 team during 2020, and played two friendly games. After that, he was member of a national U18 team.

Career statistics

References

External links
 
 

2004 births
Footballers from Novi Sad
Living people
Serbian footballers
Serbia youth international footballers
Association football forwards
FK Vojvodina players
Serbian SuperLiga players